The Hastings League is  a community rugby league competition. It features amateur teams from smaller towns around the Mid-North Coast and runs as a community competition similar to the Barwon Darling Rugby League and the Western Riverina Community Cup.

History 
The Hastings League was established in 1920 as a rugby league competition on the Mid-North Coast of New South Wales. The competition partnered with the Group 3 Rugby League in the 1990s as the Group 3 Saturday League, but has since returned to the Hastings League name and remains separate from Group 3.

In 2018, the competition began a ladies tackle grade. This competition has now expanded to allow invitees from other Groups, become independent of the competition, and is known as the North Coast Women's Rugby League.

The competition was due to celebrate its centenary season in 2020 but this was delayed until 2021 by the COVID-19 pandemic.

Clubs

Former Clubs 

 Bellangry (3 titles)
 Byabarra (3 titles)
 Camden Haven (1 title)
 Crescent Head (1 title)
 Gloucester Magpies (No titles)
 Macquarie Hotel (3 titles)
 Port Macquarie Boardriders (1 title)
 Port RSL (No Titles)
 Royal Hotel (3 titles)
 Wauchope (1 title)
 Wauchope Co-op (5 titles)
 Wilson River (No Titles)

Source:

Premiers

Men's

Ladies Tackle

North Coast Women's Rugby League 
In 2018, the Hastings League competition began a ladies tackle grade. The competition has expanded to allow invitees from other Groups, become independent of the Hastings competition, and is operating under a pilot program as the North Coast Women's Rugby League.

References 

Rugby league competitions in Australia
Rugby league competitions in New South Wales
Rugby league in New South Wales
Mid North Coast